Events from the year 1735 in Sweden

Incumbents
 Monarch – Frederick I

Events

 17 March - The Freemasonry is introduced to Sweden by Axel Wrede Sparre.
 10 May - Kongliga Ritarakademien is created: it is re-founded as the Royal Swedish Academy of Arts in 1773. 
 August - Arvid Horn renews the treaty between Sweden and Russia.
 - The Riksdag introduce and amendment to the sumptuary law of clothing from 1731, when all manner of artificial and superfluous decorations within clothing are to be banned: the law results in a fiasco when the members of parliament are themselves attacked by spies wishing to report law breakers, and in practice, the law is ignored until fallen out of use in 1738.    
 - Systema naturae by Carl Linnaeus. 
 - Sweden establish a permanent embassy at Constantinople in the Ottoman Empire.
 The Speigelberg Company tour Sweden and is confirmed to have performed in Norrköping this year.

Births

 2 April - Ulrika Pasch, painter   (died 1796) 
 23 September - Clas Bjerkander, meteorologist, botanist, and entomologist   (died 1795) 
 - Anna Hammar-Rosén, publisher   (died 1805)

Deaths

 27 September - Peter Artedi, naturalist  (born 1705) 
 
 
 
 - Charlotta von Liewen, politically active countess  (born 1683) 
 - Catharina Bröms, ironmaster  (born 1665)

References

 
Years of the 18th century in Sweden
Sweden